The 1968 Singapore Open, also known as the 1968 Singapore Open Badminton Championships, took place from 18 to 21 October 1968 at the Singapore Badminton Hall in Singapore.

Venue
Singapore Badminton Hall

Final results

References 

Singapore Open (badminton)
1968 in badminton
1968 in Singaporean sport